Star Walk is an educational astronomy application developed by Vito Technology which allows users to explore celestial objects in real time through the screen of their devices. The application has been presented within the mobile software market since 2001 and is available for iOS, Android and Windows. Since its release, Star Walk has been downloaded by over 10 million users worldwide.

Star Walk aims to help beginners in astronomy , students and professionals to locate and identify over 200,000 stars, planets, constellations and satellites in the night sky and provide detailed information about them.

Functionality

The application helps to determine the exact position of celestial objects in the sky above, calculated in real-time based on the position of the user. It also includes extra information on star clusters, meteor showers, iridium flares, galaxies and nebulae as well as the current position of dwarf planets, comets, asteroids and man-made satellites. 

Star Walk utilizes a single-screen dashboard, which shows users when the Sun (and other planets which may be visible) rises and sets at a particular location, along with the current moon phase, elevation angle, and day length. In addition to this quick identification feature, Star Walk supports the addition of calendar entries which notify the user of celestial events.  

The application is also equipped with a time machine feature, which allows users to rewind or fast-forward time to explore the map of the night sky in the past and future. Star Walk uses the iOS device camera for the augmented reality feature, combining the image data from the camera with the star map to give the user a real-time view of celestial objects.

Star Walk 2 
Star Walk 2 is an update of the original Star Walk astronomy application. This new version offers a re-designed interface with a variety of camera modes: free roam, manual/scrolling, and augmented reality. The augmented reality view also remains as a holdover from the original app. In order to explore the night sky objects, the user can orient the device toward the sky so that the application activates the camera and the charted objects can be seen appearing superimposed on live sky objects through use of augmented reality.  

Users can scroll a list of objects visible on any night and from any location on Earth. Tapping on an object name displays pop-ups that give users information on the object, a Wikipedia link for more details, and a 3D option (if available).

The Star Walk 2 application has new features such as a "What's New" feed of the latest astronomy news.

Release Timeline 
Star Walk was launched on November 8, 2008 for the iPhone and the iPod Touch. A version for the iPad was released on March 4, 2010.

Star Walk for Android was released on January 9, 2014.  

Star Walk 2 for iOS was released on August 21, 2014. A version of Star Walk 2 for Android devices premiered on March 11, 2015. 

As of July 31, 2018, Star Walk became free for all iOS devices.

Reception
In addition to its commercial success, Star Walk has been well received by critics. At WWDC 2010, Star Walk won an Apple Design Award for the iPad version. In 2012, it won Parents’ Choice Gold Award in the "Mobile Apps" category, Academics' Choice Award, and World Summit Award in "Entertainment and Lifestyle" category.

References

External links
Star Walk
Star Walk 2 (official website)
App Store – Star Walk – Explore the Sky
App Store – Star Walk HD – Night Sky View
App Store – Star Walk 2 – Night Sky Map
App Store – Star Walk 2 Ads+: Sky Map AR
Google Play – Star Walk – Night Sky Guide: Planets and Stars Map
Google Play – Star Walk 2 – Sky Guide: View Stars Day and Night
Google Play – Star Walk 2 Free – Identify Stars in the Night Sky

Astronomy education
IOS software
Android (operating system) software